2017 Premier Badminton League (also known as Vodafone PBL 2017 for sponsorship reasons) was the second edition of Premier Badminton League. It started on 1 January 2017 and concluded on 14 January 2017. It consisted of 15 league ties (each tie consisting of 5 matches) and the top four teams progressed to the knock out stages. Sachin Tendulkar became a co-owner of Bengaluru Topguns before the season and they were renamed as Bengaluru Blasters.
Awadhe Warriors, Mumbai Rockets, Chennai Smashers and Hyderabad Hunters entered the semi-finals after topping the league table. Chennai Smashers beat Awadhe Warriors 4-1 and Mumbai Rockets beat Hyderabad Hunters 3-(-1) to proceed to the final. Chennai Smashers won the tournament after beating Mumbai Rockets 4-3.

Squads 
The complete list of players of all the six participating teams

Points Table

 Qualified for semifinals
Each tie (TP) will have five matches each.
Regular Match Win (RMW) = 1 point
Trump Match Win (TMW) = 2 points
Trump Match Lost (TML) = -1 point.

Fixtures 
The fixtures for the 2017 Premier Badminton League are as follows

Knockout stage

References

2017 in badminton
2017 in Indian sport
Badminton tournaments in India
Premier Badminton League